Southern Winds Airlines (also known as SW Airlines) was an Argentine commercial air carrier that operated from 1996 until 2005. Southern Winds was founded by Juan Maggio, who served as president of the company.

History
Initially a domestic carrier, Southern Winds began offering connections to international flights in 1997. The airline's own international operations were authorized by the Argentine Government in 2001. At its peak, Southern Winds operated an extensive domestic network, international flights within the South American region, and intercontinental services from Buenos Aires to Miami and Madrid; and charter destinations like Florianopolis, Porto Seguro, Camboriu, Tacna and Punta Cana. Hubs were maintained in Córdoba (from 1996) and Buenos Aires (from 1999).

Southern Winds' fleet was composed initially by Bombardier and later the Boeing passenger planes.

Though the company was founded as a passenger carrier, cargo transport services began in 2000 under the brand name SW Cargo. In 2003, an alliance was struck between Southern Winds and the Argentine-state owned Líneas Aéreas Federales (LAFSA) that involved utilization by LAFSA of Southern Winds' flight infrastructure.

By 2004, Southern Winds was a leading commercial carrier in the troubled Argentine aviation industry. That September, however, airport police in Madrid discovered  of cocaine packed in four unaccompanied suitcases aboard an arriving Southern Winds flight. The resulting scandal cost the airline its government subsidy, and ultimately resulted in the carrier's collapse.

The last flight was operated on December 5, 2005, although several proposals for the airline's revival continued to surface by 2006.

Destinations

Bariloche (San Carlos de Bariloche Airport)
Buenos Aires (Aeroparque Jorge Newbery) Base
Buenos Aires Ministro Pistarini International Airport) Base
Comodoro Rivadavia (General Enrique Mosconi International Airport)
Córdoba (Ingeniero Aeronáutico Ambrosio L.V. Taravella International Airport) Base
El Calafate (Comandante Armando Tola International Airport)
Mar del Plata (Astor Piazzolla International Airport)
Mendoza (Governor Francisco Gabrielli International Airport)
Neuquén (Presidente Perón International Airport)
Puerto Iguazú (Cataratas del Iguazú International Airport)
Resistencia (Resistencia International Airport)
Río Gallegos (Piloto Civil Norberto Fernández International Airport)
Salta (Martín Miguel de Güemes International Airport)
San Juan (Domingo Faustino Sarmiento Airport)
San Martín de los Andes (Aviador Carlos Campos Airport)
Tucumán (Teniente General Benjamín Matienzo International Airport)
San Salvador de Jujuy (Gobernador Horacio Guzmán International Airport)
Ushuaia (Ushuaia – Malvinas Argentinas International Airport)

Tacna (Coronel FAP Carlos Ciriani Santa Rosa International Airport)

Madrid (Adolfo Suárez Madrid–Barajas Airport)

Miami (Miami International Airport)

Fleet

Southern Winds operated the following aircraft during its operations:

See also
List of defunct airlines of Argentina

References

   Site launched in 2003. Inactive end of 2005.

Defunct airlines of Argentina
Airlines established in 1996
Airlines disestablished in 2005
Argentine companies established in 1996